The 1984 South Australian Open was a men's professional tennis tournament held in Adelaide, Australia and played on outdoor grass courts. The event was part of the 1984 Grand Prix circuit. It was the 84th edition of the tournament and was held from 17 to 23 December 1984. Unseeded Peter Doohan won the singles title.

Finals

Singles

 Peter Doohan defeated  Huub van Boeckel 1–6, 6–1, 6–4
 It was Dohaan's only singles title of his career.

Doubles

 Broderick Dyke /  Wally Masur defeated  Peter Doohan /  Brian Levine 4–6, 7–5, 6–1

References

External links
 ITF tournament edition details

 
South Australian Open
South Australian Open
South Australian Open, 1984
South Australian Open

Sports competitions in Adelaide